State Road 342 (SR 342) was a north–south State Road in Vigo County, Indiana. Running for about  along the east side of the Terre Haute Regional Airport, connecting the airport to SR 42. The close proximity to a runway at the airport would result in its removal as a public roadway.

Route description
SR 342 began at the entrance to the Indiana Air National Guard's 181st Fighter Wing, housed at Terre Haute Regional Airport. The road ran north near the end of a runway at the airport to an intersection with SR 42. SR 342 ended at SR 42, but the roadway continued north as Chamberlain Street. The final traffic count for SR 342 was in 2013, where 863 vehicles travel the road on average each day.

History
In 2014 the Federal Aviation Administration requested the closure of SR 342, due to it being within the runway protection zone. The Indiana Department of Transportation (INDOT) and Terre Haute Regional Airport came to an agreement to build a new road east of SR 342, connecting to Swalls Road. This new road would be outside of the runway protection zone and also provide a new secure entrance to the 181st Intelligence Wing of the Indiana Air National Guard. With the opening of the new road INDOT decommissioned and closed SR 342.

Major intersections

References

External links

342
Transportation in Vigo County, Indiana